Anna Paola Concia (born 4 July 1963, in Avezzano) is an Italian politician and gay rights activist.

Biography
Concia was born in Avezzano, and she graduated in sports science from L'Aquila's Istituto Superiore di Educazione Fisica; following her graduation, she has worked as a physical education and tennis instructor. She first became involved with politics while at ISEF, and she was initially a member of the Italian Communist Party.

Concia moved to Rome in 1992 following the death of her mother and the collapse of her marriage. She worked as a parliamentary assistant before working as an adviser to Anna Finocchiaro, the minister responsible for equal opportunities. Concia later advised Giovanna Melandri after her promotion to Minister of Cultural Heritage and Activities in 1998. Following the 2001 general election, Concia left politics to pursue her work in tennis. She came out a year later.

Concia was named as the Democratic Party's spokesperson on homosexuality, and she used her position within the party to become a prominent activist for equal rights. She was first elected to the Chamber of Deputies in the 2008 general election.

In August 2011 she married her wife  Ricarda Trautmann in Frankfurt.

References

1963 births
Living people
People from Avezzano
Italian Communist Party politicians
Democratic Party of the Left politicians
Democrats of the Left politicians
Democratic Party (Italy) politicians
Deputies of Legislature XVI of Italy
Politicians of Abruzzo
Italian LGBT rights activists
Lesbian politicians
21st-century Italian women politicians
20th-century Italian women politicians
LGBT legislators in Italy
Women members of the Chamber of Deputies (Italy)